Al Aluminium Sports Club, is an Egyptian football club based in Nag Hammâdi, Egypt.

The club returned to the Egyptian Premier League at the beginning of the 2007–08 season, following a long absence.

Current Squad 2007/08

Managers
 Mahmoud Abou-Regaila (2000)
 Hussein Abdel-Latif (2011–2012)
 Shedeid Qinawy (2014)
 Essam Marei (2014–2015)
 Hisham Salah (2015–)

References

 
Egyptian Second Division
Football clubs in Egypt
1962 establishments in Egypt
Sports clubs in Egypt